The 22nd Annual SunBank 24 at Daytona Camel GT was a 24-hour endurance sports car race held on February 4–5, 1984 at the Daytona International Speedway road course. The race served as the opening round of the 1984 IMSA GT Championship.

Victory overall and in the GTP class went to the No. 00 Kreepy Krauly Racing March 83G driven by Sarel van der Merwe, Graham Duxbury, and Tony Martin. Victory in the GTO class went to the No. 4 Statagraph/Piedmont Chevrolet Camaro driven by Billy Hagan, Terry Labonte, and Gene Felton. Victory in the GTU class went to the No. 76 Malibu Grand Prix Mazda RX-7 driven by Ira Young, Bob Reed, Jack Baldwin, and Jim Cook.

Race results
Class winners in bold.

References

24 Hours of Daytona
1984 in sports in Florida
1984 in American motorsport